National Independence Party may refer to:

 Azerbaijan National Independence Party, a political party in Azerbaijan
 National Independence Party (Belize), a defunct political party in Belize
 Estonian National Independence Party, a defunct political party in Estonia, a predecessor of the Union of Pro Patria and Res Publica
 National Independence Party of Georgia, a defunct political party in Georgia
 National Independence Party (Ghana), a defunct political party in Ghana
 National Independence Party (Luxembourg)
 National Independence Party (Namibia), a defunct political party in Namibia
 National Independence Party (Nigeria), founded by Eyo Ita
 National Independence Party (United Kingdom), a defunct political party in the United Kingdom
 United National Independence Party, a political party in Zambia